This is a list of diplomatic missions of Mauritania, excluding honorary consulates.

Africa

 Algiers (Embassy)

 Luanda (Embassy)

 Brazzaville (Embassy) 

 Cairo (Embassy)

 Addis Ababa (Embassy)

 Bissau (Embassy)

 Abidjan (Embassy)

 Tripoli (Embassy)

 Bamako (Embassy)

 Rabat (Embassy)

Niamey (Embassy)

 Abuja (Embassy)

 Dakar (Embassy)

 Pretoria (Embassy)

 Khartoum (Embassy)

 Tunis (Embassy)

Americas

 Brasilia (Embassy)

 Washington, D.C. (Embassy)

Asia

 Beijing (Embassy)

 Jakarta (Embassy)

 Tehran  (Embassy)

 Tokyo (Embassy)

 Kuwait City (Embassy)

 Muscat (Embassy)

 Doha (Embassy)

 Riyadh (Embassy)

 Damascus (Embassy)

 Ankara (Embassy)

 Abu Dhabi (Embassy)

 Sanaa (Embassy)

Europe

 Brussels (Embassy)

 Paris (Embassy)

 Berlin (Embassy)

 Rome (Embassy)

 Moscow (Embassy)

 Madrid (Embassy)
 Las Palmas de Gran Canaria (Consulate General)

 London (Embassy)

Multilateral organisations

Cairo (Permanent Mission to the Arab League)

Brussels (Permanent Mission to the European Union)

Geneva (Permanent Mission to the United Nations and other international organizations)
New York (Permanent Mission to the United Nations)

Paris (Permanent Mission to UNESCO)

Gallery

Closed missions

 Tel Aviv (Embassy) — closed in 2009

See also
 Foreign relations of Mauritania
 List of diplomatic missions in Mauritania

References

 
Mauritania
Diplomatic missions